Jorge Vinícius Oliveira Alves (born 3 May 1988), known as Jorginho, is a Brazilian football player who plays as a forward for Costa Rica in Brazil.He also holds Portuguese citizenship.

Club career
He made his professional debut in the Segunda Liga for Mafra on 7 February 2016 in a game against Farense.

On 26 June 2018, Jorginho signed with Bulgarian club Cherno More. On 20 July 2018, he made his official debut in a 2–1 home win against Botev Vratsa.

On 14 December 2019 Jorginho transfers to Doxa in Cyprus.

Jorginho returned to Portuguese football, for the Torreense team in the season 2020/21.

On 2021 after a long time away from the country , Jorginho returns to Brazil , this time to play with Cabofriense in the second division of the Rio championship, in the same season he transferred to Tubarão, in Santa Catarina to play in the second state division.

On 02 January 2022 Jorginho is signed by the Brazilian club Costa Rica.

References

External links
 

1988 births
Footballers from São Paulo (state)
Living people
Brazilian footballers
Brazilian expatriate footballers
Association football forwards
Rio Preto Esporte Clube players
F.C. Bravos do Maquis players
Eléctrico F.C. players
C.D. Mafra players
U.D. Leiria players
S.C. Farense players
PFC Cherno More Varna players
Doxa Katokopias FC players
Girabola players
Campeonato de Portugal (league) players
Liga Portugal 2 players
First Professional Football League (Bulgaria) players
Brazilian expatriate sportspeople in Portugal
Brazilian expatriate sportspeople in Bulgaria
Brazilian expatriate sportspeople in Angola
Brazilian expatriate sportspeople in Cyprus
Expatriate footballers in Portugal
Expatriate footballers in Bulgaria
Expatriate footballers in Angola
Expatriate footballers in Cyprus